The 2013 Rhode Island Rams baseball team represents the University of Rhode Island in the 2013 NCAA Division I baseball season.  Jim Foster is in his 8th season as head coach of the Rams.  The URI baseball team, is coming off 2012 season in which they were 33–25–1. The Rams play their home games at Bill Beck Field.

2013 Roster

Schedule 

! style="" | Regular Season
|- 

|- align="center" bgcolor="#ffbbb"
| February 15 || at  || – || Dick Howser Stadium  || 5–11 ||B. Leibrandt (1–0)||M. Bradstreet (0–1) ||None|| 5,354 || 0–1 || –
|- align="center" bgcolor="#ffbbb"
| February 16 || at Florida State || – || Dick Howser Stadium  || 2–6 ||B. Johnson (1–0)||N. Narodowy (0–1)||None|| 5,229 || 0–2 || –
|- align="center" bgcolor="#ffbbb"
| February 17 || at Florida State || – || Dick Howser Stadium  || 6–8 ||G. Smith (1–0)||B. Doonan (0–1)||None|| 4,183 || 0–3 || –
|- align="center" bgcolor="#ffbbb"
| February 22 || at  || – || Swayze Field  || 1–8 ||B. Wahl (2–0)||M. Bradstreet (0–2)||None|| 9,333 || 0–4 || –
|- align="center" bgcolor="#ffbbb"
| February 23 || at Ole Miss || – || Swayze Field  || 0–1 ||B. Huber (1–0)||T. Sterner (0–1)||None|| 7,390 || 0–5 || –
|- align="center" bgcolor="#ffbbb"
| February 24 || at Ole Miss || – || Swayze Field  || 3–5 ||A. Greenwood (2–0)||L. O'Sullivan (0–1)|| B. Huber(3) || 7,121 || 0–6 || –
|- align="center" bgcolor="#ffbbb"
| February 26 || at Mississippi State || – || Dudy Noble Field  || 2–13 || Girodo (2–0)||M. Mantle (0–1)||None|| 5,945 || 0–7 || –
|- align="center" bgcolor="#ffbbb"
| February 27 || at Mississippi State || – || Dudy Noble Field  || 5–17 ||R. Mitchell (3–0)||T. Sterner (0–2)||None|| 6,343 || 0–8 || –
|-

|- align="center" bgcolor="#ffbbb"
| March 1 || Virginia Tech || – || USA Baseball National Training Complex  || 3–7 || J. Joyce (2–1)||S. Furney (0–1) ||None|| 227 || 0–9 || –
|- align="center" bgcolor="#ccffcc"
| March 2 ||  || – || USA Baseball National Training Complex || 3–0 || M. Bradstreet (1–0) || Paliotto (0–3) || None || 250 || 1–9 || –
|- align="center" bgcolor="#ccffcc"
| March 3 ||  || – || USA Baseball Nation Training Complex || 4–3 ||B. Dean (1–0)|| N. McCarty (2–1)|| None || 321 || 2–9 || –
|- align="center" bgcolor="#ffbbb"
| March 10 || at  || – || Thomas Stadium || 0–5 || Doane (3–0)||S. Furney (0–2) || None || 562 || 2–10 || –
|- align="center" bgcolor="#ffbbb"
| March 12 || at  || – || Gene Hooks Field || 5–9 || N. Jones (2–0) || L. O'Sullivan (0–2) || None || 138 || 2–11 || –
|- align="center" bgcolor="#ccffcc"
| March 13 || at  || – || UNCG Baseball Stadium || 18–8 || S. Moyers (1–0) || B. Browne (0–1)|| None || 168 || 3–11 || –
|- align="center" bgcolor="#ccffcc"
| March 15 || at  || – || Winthrop Ballpark || 4–0 || M. Bradstreet (2–2) || M. Pierpont (1–3) || None || 350 || 4–11 || –
|- align="center" bgcolor="#ccffcc"
| March 16 || at Winthrop || – || Winthrop Ballpark || 4–2 || S. Furney (1–2) || S. Kmiec (0–3) || B. Dean(1) || 452 || 5–11 || –
|- align="center" bgcolor="#ccffcc"
| March 17 || at Winthrop || – || Winthrop Ballpark || 2–1 || S. Moyers (2–0) || T. Klitsch (1–3) || B. Dean(2) || 136 || 6–11 || –
|- align="center" bgcolor="#CCCCCC"
| March 19 ||  || – || Bill Beck Field ||colspan=7| align="center" | Postponed due to weather
|- align="center" bgcolor="#ccffcc"
| March 20 ||  || – || Bill Beck Field || 8–4 || M. Mantle (1–1) || B. Tatelman (0–2) || None || 150 || 7–11 || –
|- align="center" bgcolor="#ccffcc"
| March 23 ||  || – || Bill Beck Field || 11–1 || M. Bradstreet (3–2) || D. D'Errico (0–1) || None || 209 || 8–11 || –
|- align="center" bgcolor="#ccffcc"
| March 23 || Hofstra || – || Bill Beck Field || 2–0 || S. Furney (2–2) || J. Burg (2–2) || B. Dean(3) || 240 || 9–11 || –
|- align="center" bgcolor="#ffbbb"
| March 24 || Hofstra || – || Bill Beck Field || 1–3 || Jesch (2–1) || S. Moyers (2–1) || None || 214 || 9–12 || –
|- align="center" bgcolor="#ccffcc"
| March 26 ||  || – || Bill Beck Field || 10–0 || M. Mantle (2–1) || G. Cole (1–3) || None || 135 || 10–12 || –
|- align="center" bgcolor="#ffbbb"
| March 29 || * || – || Bill Beck Field || 2–6 || P. Schrage (1–4) || M. Bradstreet (3–3) || None || 209 || 10–13 || 0–1
|- align="center" bgcolor="#ccffcc"
| March 30 || Dayton* || – || Bill Beck Field || 4–0 || S. Furney (3–2) || N. Buettgen (1–4) || None || 240 || 11–13 || 1–1
|- align="center" bgcolor="#ffbbb"
| March 31 || Dayton* || – || Bill Beck Field || 3–6 || J. Wahl (1–3) || B. Dean (1–1) || N. Weybright(3) || 214 || 11–14 || 1–2
|-

|- align="center" bgcolor="#ccffcc"
|April 2 || at  || – || Parsons Field || 4–2 || M. Mantle (3–1) || Lippert (2–1) || B. Dean(4) || 36 || 12–14 || 1–2
|- align="center" bgcolor="#ffbbb"
|April 3 ||  || – || Bill Beck Field || 0–4 || R. Anderson (1–1) || B. Russel (0–1) || None || 137 || 12–15 || 1–2
|- align="center" bgcolor="#ccffcc"
|April 5 || Massachusetts* || – || Bill Beck Field || 9–2 || M. Bradstreet (4–3) || D. Jauss (1–4) || None || 204 || 13–15 || 2–2
|- align="center" bgcolor="#ffbbb"
|April 6 || Massachusetts* || – || Bill Beck Field || 0–2 || A. Grant (2–3) || S. Furney (3–3) || None || 240 || 13–16 || 2–3
|- align="center" bgcolor="#ccffcc"
|April 7 || Massachusetts* || – || Bill Beck Field || 3–1 || B. Dean (2–1) || J. Pace (1–3) || S. Moyers(1) || 219 || 14–16 || 3–3
|- align="center" bgcolor="#ccffcc"
| April 9 ||  || – || Bill Beck Field || 7–3 || R. Curran (1–0) || K. Musco (0–2) || None || 215 || 15–16 || 3–3
|- align="center" bgcolor="#ffbbb"
| April 10 || at  || – || Conaty Park || 1–8 || J. Michaud (3–2) || L. Distasio (0–1) || None || 200 || 15–17 || 3–3
|- align="center" bgcolor="#ccffcc"
| April 12 || at * || – || Houlihan Park || 4–3 || M. Bradstreet (5–3) || J. Charest (1–6) || None || 150 || 16–17 || 4–3
|- align="center" bgcolor="#ccffcc"
| April 13 || at Fordham* || – || Houlihan Park || 4–3 || S. Furney (4–3) || C. Pike (1–6) || B. Dean(5) || 221 || 17–17 || 5–3
|- align="center" bgcolor="#ccffcc"
| April 14 || at Fordham* || – || Houlihan Park || 4–2 || B. Applin (1–0) || J. Murphy (0–1) || B. Dean(6) || 204 || 18–17 || 6–3
|- align="center" bgcolor="#ccffcc"
| April 16 || at  || – || Shea Field || 3–2 || R. Curran (2–0) || G. Goman (2–5) || B. Dean(7) || 478 || 19–17 || 6–3
|- align="center" bgcolor="#ccffcc"
| April 19 || * || – || Bill Beck Field || 3–0 || M. Bradstreet (6–3) || P. Peterson (5–1) || B. Dean(8) || 109 || 20–17 || 7–3
|- align="center" bgcolor="#ccffcc"
| April 20 || Temple*|| – || Bill Beck Field || 3–1 || S. Furney (5–3) || E. Peterson (5–1) || B. Applin(1) || 329 || 21–17 || 8–3
|- align="center" bgcolor="#ccffcc"
| April 21 || Temple* || – || Bill Beck Field || 6–2 || B. Doonan (1–1) || M. Hockenberry (1–2) || None || 204 || 22–17 || 9–3
|- align="center" bgcolor="#ccffcc"
| April 24 || at  || – || Fiondella Field || 7–1 || M. Mantle (4–1) || L. Carter (0–3) || None || 150 || 23–17 || 9–3
|- align="center" bgcolor="#ccffcc"
| April 24 || at  || – || Fiondella Field || 8–2 || T. Bowditch (1–0) || McKay (3–1) || None || 167 || 24–17 || 9–3
|- align="center" bgcolor="#ffbbb"
| April 26 || at * || – || J. Page Hayden Field || 0–2 || J. Richard (7–2) || M. Bradstreet (6–4) || None || 313 || 24–18 || 9–4
|- align="center" bgcolor="#ffbbb"
| April 27 || at Xavier* || – || J. Page Hayden Field || 0–1 || Bodner (3–1) || Applin (1–1) || None || 250 || 24–19 || 9–5
|- align="center" bgcolor="#ccffcc"
| April 27 || at Xavier* || – || J. Page Hayden Field || 6–2 || B. Dean (3–1) || Campbell (0–1) || None || 422 || 25–19 || 10–5
|- align="center" bgcolor="#ffbbb"
| April 30 || Boston College || – || Bill Beck Field || 7–8 || N. Poore (1–2) || Doonan (1–2) || J. Gormon(1) || 127 || 25–20 || 10–5
|-

|- align="center" bgcolor="#ccffcc"
| May 2 || at Brown  || – || Murray Stadium || 5–2 || R. Curran (3–0) || T. Wright (0–2) || None || 82 || 26–20 || 10–5
|- align="center" bgcolor="#ffbbb"
| May 3 || * || – || Bill Beck Field || 1–2 || A. Revello (5–5) || M. Bradstreet (6–5) || A. Johnson(2) || 209 || 26–21 || 10–6
|- align="center" bgcolor="#ccffcc"
| May 4 || St. Bonaventure* || – || Bill Beck Field || 3–2 || R. Curran (4–0) || R. Winston (4–2) || None || 328 || 27–21 || 11–6
|- align="center" bgcolor="#ccffcc"
| May 5 || St. Bonaventure* || – || Bill Beck Field || 7–0 || S. Moyers (3–1) || E. Gray (0–6) || None || 324 || 28–21 || 12–6
|- align="center" bgcolor="#ffbbb"
| May 10 || at * || – || Bulldog Park || 4–5 || Allen (3–1) || R. Curran (4–1) || Byerly(8) || 112 || 28–22 || 12–7
|- align="center" bgcolor="#ccffcc"
| May 11 || at Butler* || – || Bulldog Park || 8–3 || S. Furney (6–3) || Kramp (7–4) || None || 213 || 29–22 || 13–7
|- align="center" bgcolor="#ccffcc"
| May 12 || at Butler* || – || Bulldog Park || 17–1 || S. Moyers (4–1) || Johnson (0–3) || None || 219 || 30–22 || 14–7
|- align="center" bgcolor="#ccffcc"
| May 14 || Connecticut || – || Bill Beck Field || 7–3 || M. Mantle (5–1) || Colletti (3–2) || None || 3,124 || 31–22 || 14–7
|- align="center" bgcolor="#ccffcc"
| May 16 || at * || – || Campbell's Field || 4–1 || Bradstreet (7–5) ||  Mullen (8–4) || Applin(2) || 216 || 32–22 || 15–7
|- align="center" bgcolor="#ccffcc"
| May 17 || at Saint Joseph's* || – || Campbell's Field || 13–8 || S. Furney (7–3) || Thorpe (5–7) || None || 208 || 33–22 || 16–7
|- align="center" bgcolor="#ccffcc"
| May 18 || at Saint Joseph's* || – || Campbell's Field || 10–5 || T. Bowditch (2–0) || Carter (3–5) || None || 400 || 34–22 || 17–7
|-

|- align="center" bgcolor="#ccffcc"
| May 22 || La Salle || – || Hayes Stadium || 5–2 || M. Bradstreet (8–5) || O'Neill (5–7) || None || – || 1–0
|- align="center" bgcolor="#ffbbb"
|May 23 || Charlotte || – || Hayes Stadium || 2–5 || J. Hamilton (6–3) || S. Furney (7–4) || None || – || 1–1
|- align="center" bgcolor="#ffbbb"
|May 23 || George Washington || – || Hayes Stadium || 4–5 || L. Olson (1–2) || B. Dean (3–2) || None || 678 || 1–2
|-

|-
| style="font-size:88%" | Rankings from USA TODAY/ESPN Top 25 coaches' baseball poll. Parenthesis indicate tournament seedings.
|-
| style="font-size:88%" | *Atlantic 10 Conference games

Radio feed
The program's games were broadcast on WRIU.

References

Rhode Island
Rhode Island Rams baseball seasons
Rhode